Return From the Front is a 2022 Russian war drama film directed by Nikolay Gadomsky. It is scheduled to be theatrically released on April 21, 2022.

Plot 
The film takes place during the Great Patriotic War. The film tells about a young girl who returns home from the front, where she was a nurse and saved Soviet soldiers. But even at home she does not find peace, as she is haunted by monstrous memories.

Cast

References 

2022 films
2020s Russian-language films
Russian war drama films
2022 drama films